The Church of Jesus Christ of Latter-day Saints in Minnesota refers to the Church of Jesus Christ of Latter-day Saints (LDS Church) and its members in Minnesota. The official church membership as a percentage of general population was 0.59% in 2014. According to the 2014 Pew Forum on Religion & Public Life survey, roughly 1% of Minnesotans self-identify themselves most closely with the LDS Church. The LDS Church is the 12th largest denomination in Minnesota.

History

The first members of the LDS Church entered what is now Minnesota in the early 1840s, while the main body of the church was in Nauvoo, Illinois. At the time, church leadership sent logging camps up to the then Wisconsin Territory to bring lumber down the Mississippi River to help fuel the booming economy in Nauvoo. A branch of the church was established during this time. However, the church's presence in the area quickly disappeared when Joseph Smith, founder of the Latter Day Saint movement, was killed in Carthage, Illinois in 1844.
In 1875, the first official LDS Church congregation in Minnesota was organized in Freeborn County.

By 1930, the LDS Church had three mission districts in the state, the North Minnesota, South Minnesota, and Lake districts. Church membership at the time was 967 members. A chapel was built and dedicated by church president Heber J. Grant in 1928.

Stakes
As of February 2023, the following stakes had congregations located in Minnesota:

Mission
 Minnesota Minneapolis Mission

Temples

The St. Paul Minnesota Temple was dedicated on January 9, 2000 by church president Gordon B. Hinckley.

|}

See also

The Church of Jesus Christ of Latter-day Saints membership statistics (United States)
Minnesota: Religion

References

External links
 Newsroom (Minnesota)
 ComeUntoChrist.org Latter-day Saints Visitor site
 The Church of Jesus Christ of Latter-day Saints Official site

Christianity in Minnesota
Latter Day Saint movement in Minnesota
Minnesota